Valle de Matamoros is a Spanish municipality in the province of Badajoz, Extremadura. It has a population of 442 (2007) and an area of 4.9 km2.

References

External links 
  
 Profile 

Municipalities in the Province of Badajoz